Pinkneys Green is represented by three councillors (Wilson Hendry and Charles Hollingsworth of the Conservative Party and Kathy Newbound of the Liberal Democrats) in the Royal Borough of Windsor and Maidenhead.

As of 1 December 2011, there were 5,656 voters appearing on the electoral roll for the ward.

Royal Borough representation
The three seats for the councillor representing the ward in the Royal Borough are determined by the Multi-member plurality system (the three candidates who receive the plurality of the votes cast).  Royal Borough elections are held every four years.

Past elections results

References

Wards of the Royal Borough of Windsor and Maidenhead